Events in the year 1629 in Spain.

Incumbents 
King: Philip IV

Events 

 April 30 – Eighty Years' War: Frederick Henry of Orange lays siege to the Spanish fort 's-Hertogenbosch.
 June 17 – Anglo-Spanish War (1625): A Spanish expedition led by Fadrique de Toledo Battle of St. Kitts (1629) destroy the English colony on Nevis.
 August 19 – Eighty Years' War: Thnglo-Spanish War (1625)]]: A Spanish expedition led by Fadrique de Toledo Battle of St. Kitts (1629) destroy the English colony on St. Kitts.
 September 14 – Eighty Years' War: After a 5 month long siege, 's-Hertogenbosch surrenders to Frederick Henry, Prince of Orange. .
 The Spanish Fort Santo Domingo is built in Formosa.

Births 
 April 7 – John of Austria the Younger, Spanish general (d. 1679)

Deaths

References

 
Years of the 17th century in Spain